Pongo, is an unincorporated community  in Rockcastle County, Kentucky, United States. It is located on Kentucky Route 1249 south of Mount Vernon.

References

Unincorporated communities in Rockcastle County, Kentucky
Unincorporated communities in Kentucky